Intestine cancer may refer to:

 Colorectal cancer
 Small intestine cancer

See also 
 Gastrointestinal cancer